Mordecai ben David Strelisker (8 November 1806 – 15 October 1875), also known by the acronym Marvad Sat, was a Romanian Maskilic writer, poet, and ḥazzan. He served as cantor in the synagogue of Mihăileni.

Biography
Strelisker was born in Brody, Galicia, in 1806, the son of David and Feyge Strelisker. His paternal grandfather was from the Galician town of Strelisk. He spent his youth in his native town, where he acquired a knowledge of Hebrew literature under the instruction of Isaac Erter and Nachman Krochmal.

Strelisker's most important literary contributions are twelve essays in volumes 8–11 of Bikkure ha-Ittim. His other published works include Zakat shever, a lamentation on the death of Zalman Margulies; Ta'aniyat yeshurun, an elegy on the death of Emperor Francis I of Austria, sung during a mourning ceremony held in the old Brody synagogue; Zekher 'olam, a biography and an elegy of his father; and Shirah la-kohen (reprinted from Ha-Maggid, 1860), on the occasion of the seventieth birthday of J. S. Rappaport.

He was also an activist of the Alliance Israélite Universelle, and advocated for rationalism in Judaism, modern Jewish education, and the emancipation of Romanian Jewry.

He died in Mihăileni during Sukkot in October 1875.

Publications

References
 

1809 births
1875 deaths
19th-century essayists
19th-century Romanian Jews
19th-century Romanian poets
Hazzans
Hebrew-language poets
Jewish activists
Jewish Romanian writers
Jews from Galicia (Eastern Europe)
Jews from the Principality of Moldavia
Male essayists
People from Brody
People of the Haskalah
Romanian Ashkenazi Jews
Romanian male poets